Uncial 085 (in the Gregory-Aland numbering), ε 23 (Soden), is a Greek uncial manuscript of the New Testament, dated palaeographically to the 6th century.

Description 
The codex contains two small parts of the Gospel of Matthew 20:3-32; 22:3-16 on 3 parchment leaves (24 cm by 21 cm). Written in two columns per page, 27 lines per page (size of text 17 by 13.5 cm).

The letters are similar to Coptic. The pages are numbered in the same way as Coptic manuscripts.

Text 
The Greek text of this codex is a representative of the Alexandrian text-type with some alien readings. According to some authorities the text has mixed character. Kurt Aland placed it in Category II.

Matthew 20:23
 phrase και το βαπτισμα ο εγω βαπτιζομαι βαπτισθησεσθε (and be baptized with the baptism that I am baptized with) omitted, as in codices Sinaiticus, B, D, L, Z, Θ, f1, f13, it, syrs, c, copsa.

History 

It is dated by the Institute for New Testament Textual Research to the 6th century. The manuscript was written in a Coptic monastery. 

The codex used to be in Cairo. It is now located at the Russian National Library (Gr. 714) in Saint Petersburg.

See also 
 List of New Testament uncials
 Textual criticism

References

Further reading 
 Kurt Treu, Die Griechischen Handschriften des Neuen Testaments in der USSR; eine systematische Auswertung des Texthandschriften in Leningrad, Moskau, Kiev, Odessa, Tbilisi und Erevan, T & U 91 (Berlin: 1966), pp. 192–193.

External links 
 Uncial 085 at the Encyclopedia of Textual Criticism
 Uncial 085 at the Wieland Willker, "Textual Commentary"

Greek New Testament uncials
6th-century biblical manuscripts
National Library of Russia collection